The Psion Series 5 was a personal digital assistant (PDA) from Psion. It came in two main variants, the Series 5 (launched in 1997) and the Series 5mx (1999), the latter having a faster processor, clearer liquid crystal display (LCD), and updated software. There was also a rare Series 5mx Pro, which differed only in having the operating system (OS) loaded into random-access memory (RAM) and hence upgradeable. Ericsson marketed a version of the Series 5mx renamed as MC218.

The Psion Series 5 was a major upgrade from the Psion Series 3. A Psion Series 4 does not exist, due to Psion's concern of tetraphobia in their Asian markets. The external appearance of the Psion Series 5 and the Psion Series 5mx are broadly similar, but their mainboards and other internal components were different and not interchangeable. The screens are not interchangeable because of different screen cables.

The Series 5 was the first to feature a unique sliding clamshell design, whereby the keyboard slides forward as the device opens to counterbalance the display, and brace it such that touchscreen actuation does not topple the device, a feature mentioned in the granted European patent EP 0766166B1. This novel design approach was the work of Martin Riddiford, an industrial designer for  Design. A simplified version of this design was also used in the Psion Revo.

The moving parts and hinges can wear out or break. The most serious common problem arose because of a design fault in the screen cable where tooling holes caused needless stresses due to extra bending of the cable at this point each time the Psion Series 5 was opened or closed, and eventually leading to failure of the cable, which caused a serious display malfunction and horizontal lines appearing. The screen cable to the Psion Series 5 was more durable than the screen cable of the Psion Series 5mx. There was an after-market cable available for the 5mx which aimed to eliminate this problem.

At its heart was the 32-bit ARM710-based CL-PS7110 central processing unit (CPU) running at 18 MHz (Series 5) or 36 MHz (5mx), with 4, 8, or 16 MB of RAM. It was powered by two AA batteries, typically giving 10–20 hours of use. The display is a touch-sensitive, backlit half-Video Graphics Array (VGA,  pixel) LCD with 16 greyscales. The keyboard, which has a key-pitch of 12.5 mm, is generally considered to be amongst the best for its size, with large-travel keys and touch-type capability. Both RS-232 and infra-red serial connections were provided. A speaker and microphone were also provided, giving dictation as well as music playing ability. External storage was on CompactFlash.

The EPOC operating system, since renamed Symbian OS, was built-in, along with application software including a word processor, spreadsheet, database, email, contact and diary manager, and Psion's Open programming language (OPL) for developing software. A Java virtual machine, the mobile browser STNC HitchHiker and synchronizing software for Microsoft Windows was bundled with the 5mx as optional installations and, later, the Executive Edition of the 5mx was bundled with various hardware and software extras including version 3.62 of the Opera web browser and a mains electric outlet adapter. A wealth of third-party software was also available, including games, utilities, navigation, reference, communication, and productivity applications, and standard programming tools like Perl and Python.

An open-source software project, OpenPsion, formerly PsiLinux, supports Linux on the Psion 5mx and other Psion PDAs.

Psion's experience designing for this form factor and attention to detail made these machines a favourite with power users, many of whom kept using them, despite their age and the appearance of Symbian OS for mobile phones and other PDAs with more impressive specifications.

In 2017, a team of original Psion engineers created a startup company, Planet Computers, to make an Android device in a similar form factor, the Gemini (PDA). The Cosmo Communicator is a development of this device, enhancements including an external touchscreen on the rear of the clamshell lid, mainly to facilitate use as a mobile phone without opening. It is due for launch in mid-2019.

See also 
 Psion (company)
 Psion Organiser
 Psion Series 3
 Psion Series 7
 Gemini (PDA)

References

External links 

 The Tucows - EPOC software index.
 3-Lib, Psion freeware and shareware library
 www.openpsion.org - Linux for Psion Handhelds
 Some more Series 5 pictures
 Psion:the last computer A detailed history of Psion around the time of the Series 5
 Unofficial Psion F.A.Q
 Discussion of Psion 5mx with Some Useful Macros, Including a Macro5 Switcher Macro
 Detailed Technical Specifications of Psion Series 5mx

Psion devices
Personal information managers
Computer-related introductions in 1997